The Czech village of Háje was founded in 18th century, and became part of Prague in 1968. Now it is its own cadastral area, part of the administrative district Prague 11 (Prague 4).

Háje was founded in 18th century and historically it was part of Hostivař. Háje became part of Prague 1968. The building of Jižní Město (South Town in English), the biggest housing estate in the Czech republic started in Háje in 1971. Most of old village of Háje was demolished and replaced by panel buildings (paneláky).

There is one metro station in Háje, the name of this station is Háje (Line C).

References 

 
Prague 11